Gerhard Mans may refer to:

 Gerhard Mans (cyclist) (born 1987), Namibian cyclist
 Gerhard Mans (rugby union) (1962–2022), Namibian rugby union player